The Cincinnati Reds' 1998 season was a season in American baseball. It consisted of the Cincinnati Reds attempting to win the National League Central.

Offseason
 November 11, 1997: Paul Bako and Donne Wall were traded by the Reds to the Detroit Tigers for Melvin Nieves.
 November 11, 1997: Mike Kelly was traded by the Reds to the Tampa Bay Devil Rays for a player to be named later. The Devil Rays completed the deal by sending Dmitri Young to the Reds on  November 18.
 November 27, 1997: Ricardo Jordan was signed as a free agent by the Reds.
 December 20, 1997: Dave Weathers was selected off waivers by the Cincinnati Reds from the Cleveland Indians.
 January 8, 1998: José Rijo was signed as a free agent by the Reds.
 January 12, 1998: Pete Rose Jr. was signed as a free agent by the Reds.
 March 19, 1998: Midre Cummings was selected off waivers from the Reds by the Boston Red Sox.

Regular season

Season standings

Record vs. opponents

Notable transactions
 April 8, 1998: Buddy Carlyle was traded by the Cincinnati Reds to the San Diego Padres for Marc Kroon.
 June 24, 1998: Dave Weathers was selected off waivers by the Milwaukee Brewers from the Cincinnati Reds.
 July 4, 1998: Jeff Shaw was traded by the Reds to the Los Angeles Dodgers for Paul Konerko and Dennys Reyes.
 July 21, 1998: Jason Bere was signed as a free agent by the Reds.

Draft picks
 June 2, 1998: Adam Dunn was drafted by the Reds in the 2nd round of the 1998 Major League Baseball draft. Player signed June 11, 1998.
 June 2, 1998: Termel Sledge was drafted by the Cincinnati Reds in the 45th round of the 1998 amateur draft, but did not sign.

Roster

Player stats

Batting

Starters by position
Note: Pos = Position; G = Games played; AB = At bats; H = Hits; Avg. = Batting average; HR = Home runs; RBI = Runs batted in

Stats through the end of the 1998 season

Other batters
Note: G = Games played; AB = At bats; H = Hits; Avg. = Batting average; HR = Home runs; RBI = Runs batted in

Pitching

Starting pitchers
Note: G = Games pitched; IP = Innings pitched; W = Wins; L = Losses; ERA = Earned run average; SO = Strikeouts

Other pitchers
Note: G = Games pitched; IP = Innings pitched; W = Wins; L = Losses; ERA = Earned run average; SO = Strikeouts

Relief pitchers
Note: G = Games pitched; W = Wins; L = Losses; SV = Saves; ERA = Earned run average; SO = Strikeouts

Farm system

References

1998 Cincinnati Reds season at Baseball Reference

Cincinnati Reds seasons
Cincinnati Reds season
Cinc